Hull Brunswick F.C. was an English football club based in Hull.

History
The club competed in the Yorkshire Football League and FA Cup during the 1960s and 1970s.

Players

References

Defunct football clubs in England
Yorkshire Football League
Defunct football clubs in the East Riding of Yorkshire